Bramdean is a village in Hampshire, England.
It is a linear settlement located along the busy A272 trunk road which was widened by the American troops in 1943 in preparation for D-Day.
The village itself is peculiar due to the large number of large houses dating from the Georgian period, a few of these are set in/next to beautiful rolling parkland with specimen trees.
 The Fox Inn, which is located just a short distance from the garage, is a thriving country pub- 17th century in origin, this cosy weather-boarded building has witnessed many historic events, for example the Battle of Cheriton in the year 1644, when Sir William Waller and his troops marched through the village, it was during this time that many of the houses in the village were requisitioned for use of troops of both sides.

In the year 1823 a Roman villa was discovered in the parish. It was found to have contained two tesselated pavements of very fine qualities.
 One of the main attractions of the village is Bramdean House with its beautiful mirror image herbaceous borders, it is open on particular days of the year and all proceeds go to the National Garden Scheme, it is also in this place that on one day each year the Bramdean Village Fete is held, it has become well known and is popular amongst people in the village and in the local area.

Upon the entrance from the east the road (A272) is lined with a mid 19th century avenue of copper beech trees which was planted by Colonel George Greenwood of the Brockwood Park Estate, he also erected a rather peculiar stone circle opposite the entrance road to Brockwood.

The village church is supposed to have been built in circa 1170. It is a plain white rendered building with some 19th century additions to the south and is dedicated to St Simon and St Jude. There is also a gypsy chapel in the woods maintained by the Bishop Charity.
It is in  the civil parish of Bramdean and Hinton Ampner

References

External links

Villages in Hampshire